This article is a list of non-governmental, or privately owned, entities focused on developing and/or offering equipment and services geared towards spaceflight, both robotic and human. The list includes both inactive and active entities.

Commercial astronauts 

 Association of Spaceflight Professionals — Astronaut training, applied research and development, payload testing and integration, mission planning and operations support (Christopher Altman, Soyeon Yi)

Manufacturers of space vehicles

Cargo transport vehicles

Crew transport vehicles

Orbital

* - Format: Crewed (Uncrewed), includes failures

Suborbital

* - Format: Crewed (Uncrewed), includes failures

Launch vehicle manufacturers

Landers, rovers and orbiters

Research craft and tech demonstrators

Propulsion manufacturers

Satellite launchers

Space-based economy

Space manufacturing

Space mining

Space stations

Space settlement

Spacecraft component developers and manufacturers

Spaceliner companies

See also

 List of government space agencies
 List of spacecraft manufacturers including the "traditional space" companies
 NewSpace
 Private spaceflight
 Robert Truax
 Space industry

References

External links 
 CubeSat Database & Nanosatellites
 NewSpace Index

Lists of aviation organizations
Spaceflight, private

Companies, private
Space lists